The 1975 Campeonato Argentino de Rugby  was won by the selection of Buenos Aires that beat in the final the selection of Unión de Rugby de Tucumàn

The 1975 in Argentine rugby 
 In 1975,  Argentina, visited France in a Tour  . The results was very good, but with two loss in the test-omatch

 The selection of Buones Aires won also the  "Campeonato Juvenil" (under-19)
 The Buenos Aires Champsionship was won by C.A.S.I.
 The Cordoba Province Championship was won by Tala
 The North-East Championship was won by Los Tarcos

Premilnaries
The winner of previous edition and the host of "final four" (Tucuman) directly admitted to semifinals

Zone 1

Zone 2

Zone 3

Zone 4

Interzone

Semifinals 
 '''Score system:  Try= 4 points, Conversion=2 points .Penalty and kick from mark=  3 points. Drop= 3 points. 

 Tucumàn: J. Buscetto, J. Monterrubio, J. Rojas, M. Rodríguez, F. García, C. Rovira, C. Vidal, H. Cabrera (M. Galindo), J: Bach, J. Ghiringhelli (cap.), J. Rocchia Ferro, J. Iramain, J. Pintado, J. Posse, O. Maxud. 
Cuyo:' P. Guarrochena, M. Brand¡, D. Muñiz, O. Terranova, C. Dora, C. Navessi, J. Galindo, J. Nasazzi, R. Ituarte, J. Navessi, E. Sánchez, R. Irañeta (cap.), J. Micheli, J. Crivelli, C. Cruz. 

 Buenos Aires: M. Sansot, J. O'Farrell, A. Travaglini, A. Cappelletti, R. Rinaldi (J. Gauweloose), H. Porta, E. Morgan (cap.), J. Carracedo, H.. Miguens, C. Neira, C. Bottarini, J. Fernández, F. Insua, G. Casas, H. Nicola.
 Mar del Plata:' E. Sanguinetti, G. Beverino, C. Sosa, R. L'Erario, H. Carlón, L. Pierángeli, R. Capparelli (cap.), V. Minguez, M. Alfonso, M. Riego, W. Heath (M. Miguens), R. Losada, R. Sepe, N. Bosso, R. Bonomo.

Final 

 Buenos Aires: M. Sansot, H. O'Farrell, A. Travaglini, A. Capelletti, R. Rinaldi (J. Gauweloose), H.Porta, E. Morgan (cap.), F. Insua, G. Casas, H. Nicola, C. Bottarini, J. Fernández, J. Carracedo, H. Miguens, C. Neira.
Tucumàn:' J. Buscetto, J. Monterrubio, J. Rozas (D. Monterrubio), M. Rodríguez, F. García, C. Rovira, C. Vidal, R. Cruz, J. Ghiringhelli (cap.), J. Bach, J. Iramain, J. Rocchia Ferro, O. Maxud (S. Bellomio), J. Posee, J. Pintado.

Bibliography 
  Memorias de la UAR 1975
  XXXI Campeonato Argentino

External links 
 Memorias de la UAR 1975

Campeonato Argentino de Rugby
Argentina